Lyman Hall High School is a public high school located at 70 Pond Hill Road in Wallingford, Connecticut. It is part of the Wallingford Public School System, and one of two public high schools in Wallingford, Mark T. Sheehan being the other.

History
Lyman Hall High School is named in honor of Doctor Lyman Hall, a signatory party of the Declaration of Independence who was born in Wallingford on April 12, 1724.

The school's original location was on South Main Street, in a building constructed in 1916-1917 that today serves as Wallingford's Town Hall. In the year 1957 the school was moved to its current location at 70 Pond Hill Rd, in southeast Wallingford.

Academic programs
Lyman Hall High School has a wide range of academic courses. The school is one of only four in the entire state of Connecticut that offers courses in all of the career clusters identified by the Connecticut Department of Education. In addition to courses in what are considered normal academic areas, i.e. mathematics and science, students can elect to take courses in Agriculture, Transportation Technologies, Communication Technologies, Construction Technologies, Food Service, Family and Consumer Science, and Medical Careers.

Lyman Hall offers Spanish, French, Italian, and Latin language courses. German is offered in place of Latin at Wallingford's sister school, Mark T. Sheehan High School

Agricultural education
Lyman Hall is a Regional Agricultural Science & Technology Education Center (formerly Vocational Agriculture). Lyman Hall enrolls more than 300 students from Wallingford and nine surrounding towns for this program.

References

External links
 

Buildings and structures in Wallingford, Connecticut
Schools in New Haven County, Connecticut
Public high schools in Connecticut